Aykaç is a Turkish surname. Notable people with the surname include:

 Ayça Aykaç (born 1996), Turkish volleyball player
 Eşfak Aykaç (1918–2004), Turkish former football player and coach
 Fazıl Ahmet Aykaç (1884–1967), Turkish poet, educator, and politician
 Turgut Aykaç (born 1958), Turkish boxer

Turkish-language surnames